Pompejus Alexander Bolley (7 May 1812 in Heidelberg – 3 August 1870 in Zürich) was a German-Swiss chemist known for his work in dye chemistry.

From 1831 to 1836 he studied mineralogy and chemistry at the University of Heidelberg, where for a period of time he was an assistant to Leopold Gmelin. From 1838 to 1855 he was a professor of chemistry at the cantonal school in Aarau. He was a co-founder of the Federal Polytechnic School in Zürich, where from 1855 to 1870 he served as a professor of chemical technology. From 1859–65 he was also director of the school — in 1864 he was the target of student protests against his strict school policies.

Published works 

For 13 years he was editor of the "Schweizerischen Gewerbeblattes" ("Swiss Trade Journal"), and from 1856, editor of the "Schweizerische Polytechnische Zeitschrift", a journal that includes many of his scientific works. He also published extensively in "Liebig's Annalen". Some of his principal written efforts are:
 Handbuch der technisch-chemischen Untersuchungen, 1853 (translated into English in 1857 as "Manual of technical analysis").
 Handbuch der chemischen Technologie, 1862 – Manual of chemical technology.
 Altes und Neues aus Farbenchemie und Färberei, 1867 – Old and new on dye chemistry and dyeing.
 Manuel pratique d'essais et de recherches chimiques appliqués aux arts et à l'industrie, 1869 – Practical manual of tests and applied chemical research involving the arts and industry.
 Traité des matières colorantes artificielles dérivées du goudron de houille; with Emil Kopp, 1874 – Treatise on artificial dyes derived from coal tar.

References 

1812 births
1870 deaths
Scientists from Heidelberg
Heidelberg University alumni
Academic staff of ETH Zurich
19th-century Swiss chemists
German emigrants to Switzerland